Afroploce is a genus of moths belonging to the subfamily Tortricinae of the family Tortricidae.

Species
Afroploce cleta Razowski & Wojtusiak, 2012
Afroploce ealana Aarvik, 2004
Afroploce karsholti Aarvik, 2004
Afroploce mabalingwae Razowski, 2008
Afroploce turiana Aarvik, 2004

See also
List of Tortricidae genera

References

External links
tortricidae.com

Olethreutini
Tortricidae genera